Xincheng District (新城区) may refer to two districts in the People's Republic of China:

Xincheng District, Hohhot, Inner Mongolia
Xincheng District, Xi'an

See also
 Xicheng District, Beijing

ja:新城区
zh:新城区